Juan Manuel de Alba Flores (born 27 August 1994) is a Mexican professional footballer who plays for UdeG.

References

External links

 Juan de Alba at Fox Stats

1994 births
Living people
Association football defenders
Chiapas F.C. footballers
Querétaro F.C. footballers
Irapuato F.C. footballers
Cimarrones de Sonora players
Loros UdeC footballers
Inter Playa del Carmen players
Ascenso MX players
Liga Premier de México players
Footballers from Jalisco
People from Ocotlán, Jalisco
Mexican footballers